Prigent VII de Coëtivy  (1399 – 20 July 1450), seigneur de Coëtivy, baron de Retz and seigneur de Machecoul, was a Breton nobleman. He was in the service of the French crown and was killed at the siege of Cherbourg in 1450.

References
Nicolle, David. The Fall of English France 1449–53. Bloomsbury Publishing, 2012. 

1399 births
1450 deaths
15th-century Breton people